The Euskadiko Sozialisten Batasuna (ESBA) was a clandestine political movement in the Southern Basque Country, Spain, formed in 1959, and active under Francoist Spain. It was the Basque sister organization of the Spanish Popular Liberation Front (FELIPE) and the Catalan Workers' Front of Catalonia (FOC).

History
ESBA was founded in 1959, being heavily inspired by the Cuban revolution. In 1962 several militants of ESBA were arrested in Donostia, including their leader José Ramón Recalde. In 1965 Recalde was jailed again for refusing to pay a fine imposed for denouncing torture.

The group disappeared in 1969, due to police repression and to internal contradictions. Ex-ESBA members dispersed among many different organizations. Some former leaders of ESBA participated in the VI Assembly of ETA (1970), when most delegates approved an approach to revolutionary Marxism and the abandonment of the traditional nationalist thesis, splitting and creating the Liga Komunista Iraultzailea-ETA VI Assembly (LKI-ETA VI).

References

 García Alcalá, Julio Antonio. Historia del "Felipe" (FLP, FOC y ESBA): de Julio Cerón a la Liga Comunista Revolucionaria. Madrid: Centro de Estudios Políticos y Constitucionales, 2001.

Defunct communist parties in the Basque Country (autonomous community)
Anti-Francoism
1959 establishments in Spain
Political parties established in 1959
1969 disestablishments in Spain
Political parties disestablished in 1969